Christopher Norman Russell Prentice  (born 5 September 1954) is a retired British diplomat. His last diplomatic post was Ambassador to Italy. He is currently Chairman of the Governors of the British Institute of Florence.

Prentice had been a British diplomat since 1977. From 2002 to 2006 he served as British Ambassador to Jordan, and from 2007 to 2009 as Ambassador to Iraq.

Personal life
Born in The Borough, London, Prentice is a former cricketer who played a single first-class cricket match for Oxford University, scoring 4 and 19 in a game against Worcestershire.

Prentice speaks fluent Arabic and Hungarian. He is married to Marie-Josephine (Nina) with whom he has two sons and two daughters. One daughter, Helen, a doctor, married his predecessor's nephew, Mark, Viscount Asquith in May 2008 in Ashbury, Oxfordshire.

Prentice was appointed Companion of the Order of St Michael and St George (CMG) in the 2009 Birthday Honours.

Career
On 6 January 2010, Prentice gave evidence to the Iraq Inquiry.

From March to May 2011 Prentice led the UK's diplomatic team in Libya which liaised closely with the opposition in Benghazi.

Career highlights
1977–1978            FCO, Desk Officer, Near East and North Africa Department
1985–1989            Washington, First secretary (Near East and South Asia)
1989–1990            FCO, Assistant Head of European Community Department (External)
1990–1993            FCO, Assistant Private Secretary to Foreign Secretary Douglas Hurd
1994–1998            Budapest, Deputy Head of Mission
1998–2002            FCO, Head of Near East and North Africa Department
2002–2006            Amman, Her Majesty's Ambassador
2006–2007            UK Special Representative, later FCO Co-ordinator for the Sudan Peace Process
2007–2009            Iraq, Her Majesty's Ambassador
2011–2016            Italy, Her Majesty's Ambassador

References

 "Change of Her Majesty's Ambassador to the Republic of Iraq". Retrieved 25 May 2008.
"UK appoints fourth Iraq ambassador in four years" 7 July 2007. IRNA - Islamic Republic News Agency. Retrieved 25 May 2008.

Ambassadors of the United Kingdom to Jordan
Ambassadors of the United Kingdom to Italy
Ambassadors of the United Kingdom to Iraq
1954 births
Living people
Companions of the Order of St Michael and St George
Oxford University cricketers
English cricketers
Alumni of Christ Church, Oxford